The  was a preliminary round of the battle of Miyajima which was to follow. Mōri Motonari sought to avenge Sue Harukata's coup against their lord, Ōuchi Yoshitaka, and succeeded. 

Following the battle of Miyajima, the Mōri clan gained all the Ōuchi lands, and replaced them as one of the most powerful families in the country.

Further reading
Sansom, George (1961). A History of Japan: 1334–1615. Stanford: Stanford University Press.

Notes

References
Turnbull, Stephen (1998). 'The Samurai Sourcebook'. London: Cassell & Co.

1554 in Japan
Oshikibata
Mōri clan
Ōuchi clan
Oshikibata